Tale of Sand is a comic book based on an unmade film script by Jim Henson and Jerry Juhl.

Development
Jim Henson created the idea in the mid to late 1950s and worked with Jerry Juhl in writing the story throughout the late '60s and early '70s.

In January 2012, The Jim Henson Company, partnered with Archaia Entertainment and published a graphic novel version of Henson and Juhl's script with the artwork by Ramón Pérez. Lisa Henson was instrumental getting the story in comic book form in partnership with Archaia editor-in-chief Stephen Christy.

Plot

It's about a man called Mac who wakes up in an unknown town and is pursued across the desert for the Southwest by strange people and beasts.

Reception
The comic had a mostly positive reception from critics.

References

The Jim Henson Company
Boom! Studios titles